José Antonio Montero Botanch (born January 3, 1965 in Barcelona, Spain) is a retired Spanish professional basketball player.

Professional career
Montero was selected 113th overall, by the Atlanta Hawks, at the 1987 NBA draft. He was the second Spanish player to be drafted by an NBA franchise, after Fernando Martín. However, he never played in the NBA.

As a member of FC Barcelona, he competed in two EuroLeague Finals, in 1991, and 1996. He was a FIBA European Selection in 1990. In 1991, he was selected to the EuroLeague All-Final Four Team.

National team career
Montero was a regular member of the senior Spanish national team. With Spain, he reached the semifinals at EuroBasket 1987.

Awards and accomplishments
3× Spanish League Champion: 1994–95, 1995–96, 1996–97
2× Spanish Cup Winner: 1990–91, 1993–94
2× EuroLeague runner up: 1991, 1996 
FIBA Saporta Cup runner up: 1988
FIBA Korać Cup Champion: 1990

References
ACB.com Profile 
FIBA.com Profile

1965 births
Living people
Atlanta Hawks draft picks
Basketball players at the 1988 Summer Olympics
FC Barcelona Bàsquet players
Joventut Badalona players
Liga ACB players
Limoges CSP players
Olympic basketball players of Spain
Point guards
Spanish expatriate basketball people in France
Spanish men's basketball players
1990 FIBA World Championship players
Basketball players from Barcelona